John Quincy Rhodes Jr. (November 27, 1892 – May 18, 1959) was an American attorney and politician who served in the Virginia House of Delegates, representing Louisa County.

References

External links 

1892 births
1959 deaths
Democratic Party members of the Virginia House of Delegates
20th-century American politicians
People from Louisa, Virginia